Ma Shi (15th century), courtesy name as Jingzhan (敬瞻), was a Chinese landscape painter, court astronomer, and poet during the Xuande era of the early Ming Dynasty. His birth and death years are unknown. He was a native of Jiading (modern day Shanghai).

Notes

References
 Zhongguo gu dai shu hua jian ding zu (中国古代书画鑑定组). 2000. Zhongguo hui hua quan ji (中国绘画全集). Zhongguo mei shu fen lei quan ji. Beijing: Wen wu chu ban she. Volume 10.

Ming dynasty landscape painters
Year of death unknown
Painters from Shanghai
Year of birth unknown
15th-century Chinese painters
15th-century Chinese poets
15th-century Chinese astronomers